Mohamed Juldeh Jalloh is a Sierra Leonean  politician and the current Vice President of Sierra Leone since 4 April 2018. Jalloh is a political scientist, businessman and a former United Nations official. Jalloh is a senior member of the Sierra Leone People's Party.

Dr. Juldeh Jalloh earned a bachelor's degree in political science from Fourah Bay College, a Master's degree in political science from the University of Ibadan in Ibadan, Nigeria; and doctorate degree from the University of Bordeaux in Bordeaux, France. Jalloh is fluent in several languages including English and French.

A political scientist by profession, Jalloh started working for the United Nations in 2000, when he was a program officer at the United Nations mission in Kosovo. He has also served as a member of the board of senior advisers at the United Nations stabilization mission in Mali and the Sahel region.

He was appointed the presidential running mate of Julius Maada Bio in the Sierra Leonean general election of 2018, which they won in a run-off.

Juldeh Jalloh is a devout Muslim, and was born and raised in Koidu, Kono District in eastern Sierra Leone. He is a member of the Fula ethnic group.

References

Vice-presidents of Sierra Leone
Sierra Leonean political scientists
Sierra Leonean officials of the United Nations
Sierra Leone People's Party politicians
People from Koidu
University of Ibadan alumni
University of Bordeaux alumni
Living people
Sierra Leonean Fula people
Sierra Leonean Muslims
Year of birth missing (living people)